This is a list of all United States Supreme Court cases from volume 402 of the United States Reports:

External links

1971 in United States case law